Ceveriano García Palominos  (born 18 July 1986 in Mexico City, Mexico) is a Mexican professional football player. He is currently the soccer coach of the Mabton Viking's soccer team.

External links
 2007 Yakima roster and stats - USL Soccer
 2008 Yakima roster and stats - USL Soccer
 2009 Yakima roster and stats - USL Soccer

1986 births
Living people
Footballers from Mexico City
Association football forwards
Mexican footballers
Yakima Reds players
C.D. Vista Hermosa footballers
Mexican expatriate footballers
Expatriate soccer players in the United States
Mexican expatriate sportspeople in the United States
Expatriate footballers in El Salvador
Mexican expatriate sportspeople in El Salvador
USL League Two players